The Arab Bulletin was a publication published from June 6, 1916 - August 30, 1918 by Britain's Arab Bureau. It was established to provide "a secret magazine of Middle East politics" D. G. Hogarth once described the newspapers editorial policy thus:

 
The bulletin was published a few times a month, and 25 people were intended to view it. Among those people were the Foreign Office, The Admiralty and The Director of Military Intelligence.

References 

Magazines established in 1916
Magazines disestablished in 1918
Defunct political magazines published in the United Kingdom
Propaganda newspapers and magazines